Brian Morrisroe (born 17 April 1972 in Dublin) is an Irish footballer who plays for Manortown Utd 

A midfielder he made his League of Ireland debut for St Patrick's Athletic at Dundalk on 26 September 1993. Morrisroe scored the winner against Southampton F.C. in a friendly in July 1995.

Morrisroe played in two 1996–97 UEFA Cup games for the Richmond Park (football ground) side.

He moved to Shamrock Rovers in June 1997.

Morrisroe made 2 appearances in the 1998 UEFA Intertoto Cup for Rovers before moving to Dundalk making his debut in a 1–0 home defeat to Longford Town on 22 August 1999 and subsequently helped the Lilywhites on their way to promotion from the First Division in 2001, before leaving Oriel Park  to sign for Ballymena United in February 2001. He had a subsequent spell at Athlone Town.

He spent a few years out of the League of Ireland playing with Glenmore Dundrum in the Leinster Senior League.

He signed for Sporting Fingal in 2008 and made his Sporting debut on 4 July 2008 where he was Man of the Match  and went on to make 11 total league appearances.

Honours
 League of Ireland
 St Patrick's Athletic 1995/96
FAI Cup Runner up 1995/96
 FAI Super Cup
 Shamrock Rovers 1998

References

Republic of Ireland association footballers
St Patrick's Athletic F.C. players
Shamrock Rovers F.C. players
Dundalk F.C. players
Athlone Town A.F.C. players
Limerick F.C. players
Ballymena United F.C. players
Expatriate association footballers in Northern Ireland
Sporting Fingal F.C. players
League of Ireland players
Association footballers from Dublin (city)
1972 births
Living people
Association football midfielders